Juan Manuel Cortés (born November 20, 1980 in Quilmes (Buenos Aires), Argentina) is an Argentine footballer currently playing for Boca Río Gallegos in Torneo Argentino B.

Teams
  Belgrano de Córdoba 2000-2002
  Racing de Córdoba 2002-2005
  San Martín de Tucumán 2005-2006
  Santamarina de Tandil 2006-2007
  Tiro Federal 2007-2008
  Unión de Sunchales 2008-2009
  Coquimbo Unido 2009
  9 de Julio 2010
  Central Norte 2010
  Batavia Union 2011-2012
  Boca Río Gallegos 2012

References
 Profile at BDFA 
 Profile at Futbol XXI  

1980 births
Living people
Argentine footballers
Argentine expatriate footballers
San Martín de Tucumán footballers
Club Atlético Belgrano footballers
Racing de Córdoba footballers
Tiro Federal footballers
Coquimbo Unido footballers
Primera B de Chile players
Expatriate footballers in Chile
Expatriate footballers in Indonesia
Association footballers not categorized by position
People from Quilmes
Sportspeople from Buenos Aires Province